The Machakhelistsqali or Machakhlitskal (Mač’axelisc’q’ali) is a river that flows from the Artvin Province in Turkey to Adjara autonomous republic of Georgia. It is a right tributary of the Çoruh (Chorokhi).

References

 

Rivers of Turkey
Rivers of Georgia (country)
International rivers of Europe
International rivers of Asia
Landforms of Artvin Province